The University of Illinois Hospital & Health Sciences System is a member of the Illinois Medical District, one of the largest urban healthcare, educational, research, and technology districts in the USA. The University of Illinois Hospital & Health Sciences System itself is composed of the 485-bed University of Illinois Hospital, outpatient diagnostic and specialty clinics, and two Federally Qualified Health Centers (FQHCs) that serve as primary teaching facilities for the University of Illinois at Chicago (UIC) Health Science Colleges. The eight-story inpatient facility provides patient care services from primary care through and including transplantation, with a medical staff in a variety of specialties. In 1999, the  Outpatient Care Center (OCC) opened with a fully computerized medical record system, allowing patient records to be accessible electronically. The OCC houses all subspecialty and general medicine outpatient services and the Women's Health Center.

The Hospital serves as a referral site for the seriously ill throughout the city, state and world. In fiscal year 2010, approximately 14,000 inpatient and outpatient surgeries were performed, over 57,000 patients visited the emergency department, and 20,000 patients were admitted to the hospital.

As the largest medical school in the country, the College of Medicine (COM) educates over 2,600 medical students and trainees. The community has collaborative relationships between the Medical Center and UIC's Health Science Colleges, which includes the Colleges of Medicine, Dentistry, Pharmacy, Allied Health Professions, Nursing and the School of Public Health.

In addition, the UIC campus hosts the Lions of Illinois Eye Research Institute, the Light House for the Blind, and the Illinois Eye and Ear Infirmary (IEEI), making this a major statewide referral center for eye disease.

History
The University of Illinois Hospital & Health Sciences System dates back to 1919, when a cooperative agreement between the University of Illinois and the Illinois Department of Public Welfare resulted in the construction of the Research and Educational Hospitals. Two years prior, in 1917, the State of Illinois had acquired the vacated Chicago Cubs Park located at Polk and Wolcott, which in turn was used by the University of Illinois to build two new medical college buildings and the hospital. The eventual aging of the Research and Educational Hospitals gave rise to the building of the current University of Illinois Hospital in 1980. Today, over 500 primary care physicians and specialists provide primary and specialty care to patients from the city, state and around the world.

In September 2020, during the COVID-19 pandemic, several hundred nurses and workers participated in the 2020 University of Illinois Hospital strikes.

Reputation
The University of Illinois Hospital & Health Sciences System was ranked as the 5th best hospital in the Chicago metropolitan area according to the U.S. News & World Report America's Best Hospitals report and ranked among the best in the nation in: diabetes and endocrinology (#44); cancer (oncology); otolaryngology; gynecology; nephrology (kidney disorders); neurology and neurosurgery; ophthalmology; orthopaedics; pulmonology; and urology.

Notes

1919 establishments in Illinois
Healthcare in Chicago
Hospitals in Chicago
University of Illinois Chicago